Bayındır is a village in the Keban District of Elazığ Province in Turkey. Its population is 25 (2021). The village is populated by Kurds and Turkmens.

References

Villages in Keban District
Kurdish settlements in Elazığ Province